The International Bilingual School of Provence (founded in 1984) is a mixed day and boarding school situated in Luynes on the outskirts of Aix-en-Provence in the south of France. With over 700 students, more than 75 different nationalities, students from 2 to 18 years old learn in a multilingual environment. The school is an International Baccalaureate accredited school and also offers the traditional French curriculum as well as the IGCSEs from Cambridge.

References

External links
Website of International Bilingual School of Provence (in French)
Website of International Bilingual School of Provence (in English)

Educational institutions established in 1984
Private schools in France
International Baccalaureate schools in France
1984 establishments in France
Schools in Provence-Alpes-Côte d'Azur
Buildings and structures in Bouches-du-Rhône